Dominic Dierkes  is an American actor, comedian and writer best known for his involvement in the sketch comedy group Derrick Comedy.

Early life
Dierkes was born and raised in Memphis, Tennessee. He began doing stand-up comedy at the age of 14 and since he was underage his parents had to be present at his sets. He attended Tisch School of the Arts where he majored in film/television production. There he joined the sketch comedy group Hammerkatz NYU alongside future Derrick Comedy members Donald Glover and DC Pierson. During this time Dierkes began taking classes at the Upright Citizens Brigade Theatre and both of his comedy groups performed there regularly.

Career
With Derrick Comedy gaining notoriety through their comedic videos on YouTube, the group subsequently wrote and starred in the 2009 comedy Mystery Team. Dierkes is a former writer for ONN, the "television" branch of satirical newspaper The Onion. Dierkes has appeared in such television shows as Parks and Recreation, Community, The Nighttime Clap, and Mad Men. He had a recurring role on the Showtime show Weeds. He and his writing partner, Sean Clements, were writers on the short-lived Fox animated series Allen Gregory in 2011. In 2012 they joined the writing staff of Workaholics for its third season, and Dierkes guest starred in the 15th episode, "Webcam Girl", as Keith, the owner of the site.

Personal life
Dierkes has been a teetotaler since moving to Los Angeles.

References

External links

Official website for Derrick Comedy

Living people
American male comedians
21st-century American comedians
American male film actors
American male television actors
New York University alumni
Male actors from Memphis, Tennessee
Writers from Memphis, Tennessee
Upright Citizens Brigade Theater performers
Year of birth missing (living people)